The Boise State Broncos tennis program represents Boise State University in the Mountain West Conference. The program has a long history, several notable accomplishments and has several notable alumni.

Current coaching staff

Head coaches

Year-by-year Conference results Men

NCAA tourney appearances and results

|}

Conference championships

Year-by-year Conference results Women

NCAA tourney appearances and results

Conference championships

Honors

College Tennis Hall of Famers

Players
Greg Patton – Player, 1900–1900

Individual awards

NCAA

Current ATP players
Wesley Moodie – Men's, 1998–2000

Current WTA players
Name – S;D;M

Notable former tennis players
Former BSU Tennis players that have become notable outside of tennis.

Men
Steve Appleton – Men's, 0000–0000

Women

References

External links
  (men's)
  (women's)

 
College tennis teams in the United States
Tennis in Idaho